Sheridan is a city and county seat of Grant County, Arkansas, United States. The community is located deep in the forests of the Arkansas Timberlands. It sits at the intersection of US Highways 167 and 270. Early settlers were drawn to the area by the native timber, which is still a very important part of Sheridan's economy, although the city has diversified into several other industries. Sheridan's history also includes a college, Missionary Baptist College, until its closure in 1934, and a series of conflicts during the Civil Rights Movement. Located at the southern end of the Central Arkansas region, Sheridan has been experiencing a population boom in recent years, as indicated by a 49% growth in population between the 1990 and 2010 censuses. The population as of the 2010 census was 4,603.

History

Louisiana Purchase through Early Statehood 
In 1818–1824, the land that Sheridan currently occupies was the site of a Quapaw reservation. After the Indian Removal Act of 1830, the Quapaw were removed from the land and pushed further west. By 1833 most of the natives had been moved westward and the land was ceded to the United States.

Eponym
Sheridan was named after , who served as the 8th Commanding General of the United States Army from 1883 to 1888.

Settlement through the Gilded Age
The first white settler was Dr. Richard C. Rhodes, a native of North Carolina.

At the beginning of the 20th century, a railroad passed through Sheridan south into Dallas County. The railroad, owned by E. S. McCarty, carried freight and passengers for hire.

From 1917 to 1934, Missionary Baptist College operated in Sheridan. The college suffered from financial troubles due to the Great Depression. The college provided local residents with courses, not only in theology, but in Latin, Greek, physiology, ecclesiology, and expression. A 1920 bulletin issued by the college wrote that its goal was "to teach and emphasize the very principles for which the real Baptists of Arkansas stand and for which true Baptists have stood for almost nineteen centuries . . . this is no preacher manufacturing establishment [that] the Lord alone has the prerogative of calling men to preach the gospel."  The revamped Missionary Baptist Seminary thereafter opened in Little Rock.

Mid-twentieth century
In 1943, Jewell Williams, a Jehovah's Witness, was convicted in the Mayor's Court for selling Bibles without a permit under Sheridan City Ord. No. 50. and fined $10. On a trial de novo, he obtained the same result. Williams joined other members of his faith and appealed similar convictions occurring across the state to the Arkansas Supreme Court in Berry v. City of Hope, challenging the city ordinance as unconstitutional under the First Amendment. The court agreed and held the ordinances unconstitutional.

Tickets were $4 before the show and lasted three days, July 4–6, 1973. The National Guard was sent out to maintain "peace". Local property owners attempted to get a court-ordered injunction to halt the festival from talking place, on the legal theory of nuisance, but to no avail.

In 1954, Sheridan's school board voted to comply with the Supreme Court's decision in Brown vs Board of Education.  Sheridan had operated an elementary school for Black children and bused its Black high school students to schools in other counties  The protests were so severe that the school board reversed itself the following night.  Then, local sawmill owner Jack Williams told his Black employees that they could accept his offer to buy out their homes and give them to the employees, and all move 25 miles west to the town of Malvern.  Black residents had no choice, for Williams told them that "if a family refused to  move, he would evict them and burn down their home."  This left Sheridan as a sundown town, and instead of becoming "one of the most racially progressive towns in Arkansas if its initial school board decision had stood, instead became one of its most backward."  Loewen's research describes the fact that "no Sheridan resident lifted a voice to protest the forced buyout of its black community" and a "reputation for bigotry when their high school played interracial teams in athletic contests."

Demographics

Sheridan is part of the Little Rock–North Little Rock–Conway Metropolitan Statistical Area.

2020 census

As of the 2020 United States census, there were 4,920 people, 1,884 households, and 1,235 families residing in the city.

2010 census
As of the 2010 United States census of 2010, there were 4,603 people, 1,841 households, and 1,238 families residing in the city. The racial makeup of the city was 95.0% White, 1.6% Black or African American, 0.4% Native American, 0.5% Asian, 1.3% from other races, and 1.2% from two or more races.  2.8% of the population were Hispanic or Latino of any race. There were 1,841 households, out of which 32.7% had children under the age of 18 living with them, 49.0% were married couples living together, 13.2% had a female householder with no husband present, and 31.8% were non-families. 27.5% of all households were made up of individuals, and 12.2% had someone living alone who was 65 years of age or older. The average household size was 2.46 and the average family size was 2.98.

In the city, the population was spread out, with 25.2% under the age of 18, 9.1% from 18 to 24, 33.7% from 25 to 44, 16.9% from 45 to 64, and 15.1% who were 65 years of age or older. The median age was 36.6 years. The gender makeup of the city was 49.6% male and 50.4% female.

The median income for a household in the city was $57,305, and the median income for a family was $64,123. Males had a median income of $46,438 versus $31,580 for females. The per capita income for the city was $23,969.  About 3.8% of families and 8.1% of the population were below the poverty line, including 3.8% of those under age 18 and 11.7% of those age 65 or over.

2000 census
As of the 2000 United States Census, there were 3,872 people, 1,509 households, and 1,050 families residing in the city. The racial makeup of the city was 97.34% White, 0.96% Black or African American, 0.28% Native American, 0.15% Asian, 0.05% Pacific Islander, 0.57% from other races, and 0.65% from two or more races.  0.96% of the population were Hispanic or Latino of any race. 
There were 1,509 households, out of which 35.4% had children under the age of 18 living with them, 56.4% were married couples living together, 10.4% had a female householder with no husband present, and 30.4% were non-families. 27.0% of all households were made up of individuals, and 10.9% had someone living alone who was 65 years of age or older.  The average household size was 2.49 and the average family size was 3.02.

In the city, the population was spread out, with 26.3% under the age of 18, 8.6% from 18 to 24, 30.6% from 25 to 44, 20.9% from 45 to 64, and 13.6% who were 65 years of age or older.  The median age was 35 years. For every 100 females, there were 90.7 males.  For every 100 females age 18 and over, there were 91.0 males.

The median income for a household in the city was $37,207, and the median income for a family was $43,953. Males had a median income of $32,216 versus $22,891 for females. The per capita income for the city was $19,184.  About 7.0% of families and 9.8% of the population were below the poverty line, including 11.3% of those under age 18 and 17.6% of those age 65 or over.

Education

Sheridan is provided public education from the Sheridan School District, including the Sheridan High School.

Sheridan had a segregated school for African-Americans until the Brown v. Board decision. At the time, Sheridan had around 199 African American residents out of the town's total population of 1,898. On May 21, 1954, the local school board voted unanimously to integrate its 21 African-American students into its high school to avoid the $4,000 it would have cost the school board to send them to Jefferson County. The white parents became upset and called another vote the next night. At that vote, the board voted unanimously to keep the local school segregated. Community members in the area, still not happy, petitioned and forced four school board members to step down.

Next, Jack Williams, the largest employer of African-Americans in the area, told Black families that they could accept his offer to buyout their homes and move them, or he would burn their houses down. After the departure of the last African-American student from the city limits, the city bulldozed the African-American school; the remnants of the school were buried and the city no longer had a duty to integrate their schools. This incident is recounted by former resident James Seawood on storycorps.

In March 2014, Sheridan High School principal Rodney Williams ordered the removal of student profiles from the student yearbook, rather than publish one of an openly gay student. In response, a human rights organization held a rally on the State Capitol steps, and the principal received a petition with 30,000 signatures asking Williams to reverse the decision.

Arts and culture

Sheridan hosts an annual event based on the area's deep roots in the timber industry called Timberfest, which includes a lumberjack competition and live music around the courthouse square. The White River Kid, starring Antonio Banderas and Randy Travis, was filmed during a mock Timberfest during the summer of 1998, with many of the local residents appearing as extras.

Tourism

The Grant County Museum, located on Shackleford Road in Sheridan, preserves and interprets the history and culture of the county for residents and visitors. The museum features exhibits detailing the Battle of Jenkins' Ferry, a segment of the Union's failed Red River Campaign during the Civil War, as well as a large World War II vehicle collection. Other exhibits include pioneer life and settlement in Grant County, and the flora and fauna native to the county. The Heritage Square is also on the museum grounds, featuring ten relocated and restored buildings. Just 5.8 miles north of Sheridan is the B-17 Crash Memorial where a replica B-17 was constructed to honor nine airmen who died in a plane crash at this location in 1943.

Media
Bales and Cleveland started the first newspaper in the Grant County area, titled The Sheridan Spy. The first issue was dated September 1, 1881. In 1882, the Hon. J.S. Williams, who a year later became a state senator, bought the Sheridan Spy and renamed it The Sheridan Headlight, which is still published today. Jacob Palmer, who now serves on the Sheridan School Board, was formerly a reporter for the Sheridan Headlight. The short lived Grant County News was started in 1916 by William GoForth.

Utilities

Sheridan's water system began when a private entity began installing water lines in the 1930s. This system was eventually purchased by the city, which now allows the Sheridan Water and Sewer Department to operate the system independently of city funds. Today, Sheridan is capable of treating groundwater obtained from five wells at a rate of 4.5 million gallons (17 million liters) per day (MGD/MLD). Sheridan's wastewater treatment facility is located at the end of Gatzke Drive and discharges treated effluent to Big Creek in accordance with the permit granted by the Arkansas Department of Environmental Quality. The facility utilizes a three-cell pond stabilization system followed by a holding pond and is designed for a flow of 0.67 MGD (2.5 MLD).

Notable people
Ken Bragg, Republican member of the Arkansas House of Representatives from Sheridan since 2013 
Buck Fausett, Major League Baseball player
David Delano Glover, United States representative for Arkansas's 6th congressional district from 1929 to 1935
Ray Hamilton, football player who played defensive end in the National Football League from 1938 to 1947, inducted into the Arkansas Sports Hall of Fame
John Little McClellan, lawyer and politician, United States representative for Arkansas's 6th congressional district from 1935 to 1939, United States senator for Arkansas from 1943-1977. 
Earl Smith, baseball player who played for the World Series champion Giants and Pirates.
Eddie Joe Williams, State Senate Majority Leader, formerly mayor of Cabot, Arkansas
Jami Cook, Career law enforcement officer and Secretary of the Arkansas Department of Public Safety

See also

 List of cities and towns in Arkansas
 List of places named after people in the United States
 National Register of Historic Places listings in Grant County, Arkansas

References

Further reading

External links

 
 
 

 
1887 establishments in Arkansas
Cities in Arkansas
Cities in Grant County, Arkansas
Cities in Little Rock–North Little Rock–Conway metropolitan area
County seats in Arkansas
Philip Sheridan
Planned cities in the United States
Populated places established in 1887